Stupid sort may refer to:

 Bogosort, based on the generate and test paradigm
 Gnome sort, similar to insertion sort

Sorting algorithms